Odoacre Chierico (born 28 March 1959) is an Italian professional football coach and a former player who played as a midfielder.

Personal life
His son Luca is also a footballer.

Honours

Club
Inter
 Coppa Italia: 1977–78

Roma
 Serie A: 1982–83
 Coppa Italia: 1983–84

References

External links
Profile at Almanaccogiallorosso.it

Italian footballers
Italian football managers
Inter Milan players
Pisa S.C. players
A.S. Roma players
Udinese Calcio players
A.C. Cesena players
Ascoli Calcio 1898 F.C. players
A.S. Gubbio 1910 players
Potenza S.C. managers
Serie A players
Serie B players
Serie C players
Association football midfielders
1959 births
Living people